Emon is a Bengali and Japanese name. In both cultures it may be both a given name and a surname.

Statistics
The 2010 United States Census found 120 people with the surname Emon, making it the 139,228th-most-common surname in the country. This represented an increase from 107 people (142,819th-most-common) in the 2000 census. In both censuses, slightly less than nine-tenths of the bearers of the surname Emon identified as non-Hispanic white, and about seven percent as Asian.

People

Bengali

The Bengali name, originating from the Arabic word iman, means "religious faith". People with this name include:

Shawkat Ali Emon (born 1941), Bangladeshi composer
Salman Shah (actor) (real name Shahriar Chowdhury Emon; 1971–1996), Bangladeshi film and television actor
Mamnun Hasan Emon (born 1983), Bangladeshi film actor
Emon Mahmud Babu (born 1993), Bangladeshi footballer
Anisul Islam Emon (born 1994), Bangladeshi cricketer
Parvez Hossain Emon (born 2002), Bangladeshi cricketer
Abu Shahed Emon, Bangladeshi film director
Emon Saha, Bangladeshi composer
Emon Ahmed, Bangladeshi cricketer
Emon Chowdhury, Bangladeshi musician

Japanese

The Japanese name means "palace guard" – literally, "guardian of the gate". People with this name include:

, legendary figure of early ninth-century Japan
, Japanese waka poet

Other
Albert Emon (born 1953), French football manager

References

Bangladeshi given names
Bengali Muslim surnames
Japanese-language surnames
Japanese masculine given names